E. Martin Estrada (born 1976/1977) is an American lawyer who serves as the United States attorney for the Central District of California since September 2022.

Early life and education

Estrada's family emigrated from Guatemala, and he grew up in the Costa Mesa area. He received a Bachelor of Arts, magna cum laude, from the University of California, Irvine in 1998 and his Juris Doctor from Stanford Law School, with distinction, in 2002.

Career 

After graduating law school, Estrada served as a law clerk for Judge Robert Timlin of the United States District Court for the Central District of California from 2002 to 2003 and Judge Arthur Alarcón of the United States Court of Appeals for the Ninth Circuit from 2003 to 2004. He served as an Assistant United States Attorney in the United States Attorney's Office for the Central District of California from 2007 to 2014. Since 2014, he has been a partner with partner at Munger, Tolles & Olson; he served as an associate at the same firm from 2004 to 2007. As a lawyer, he represented Plains All American Pipeline in the Refugio oil spill, in which the company agreed to pay $230 million to settle claims. He also has experience with immigration and education cases, one in which he successfully argued that New Mexico was providing insufficient education to students, including Latino and Native American students.

U.S. attorney for the Central District of California 

On June 6, 2022, President Joe Biden nominated Estrada to be the United States attorney for the Central District of California. His nomination was supported by Senator Alex Padilla. On July 28, 2022, his nomination was reported out of the Senate Judiciary Committee by a voice vote. On September 13, 2022, his nomination was confirmed in the United States Senate by voice vote. He was sworn in by Chief Judge Philip S. Gutierrez on September 19, 2022.

References

1970s births
Living people
Year of birth missing (living people)
Place of birth missing (living people)
21st-century American lawyers
Assistant United States Attorneys
California lawyers
Hispanic and Latino American lawyers
People associated with Munger, Tolles & Olson
Stanford Law School alumni
United States Attorneys for the Central District of California
University of California, Irvine alumni